András Simonyi (born 16 May 1952) is a former Hungarian ambassador, transportation economist, author. He is an independent consultant living in the U.S. He is a senior fellow at the Global Energy Center Atlantic Council of the United States. He is also associated with the George Washington University, Washington D.C.  From 2012 to 2018 he was the managing director of the Center for Transatlantic Relations at the Paul Nitze School of Advanced International Studies at Johns Hopkins University in Washington DC. He was the Hungarian ambassador to the United States between 2002 and 2007. He was also Hungary's first ambassador to the North Atlantic Treaty Organization. His professional focus today is energy security, the role of the private sector in energy transition.

Simonyi was appointed ambassador to the U.S. in 2002 under the administration of Prime Minister Péter Medgyessy, and presented his credentials on 25 September 2002. He replaced ambassador Géza Jeszenszky, who left office in August, 2002.

He plays guitar in the rock band, The Coalition of the Willing (est.2003) with top rated U.S. guitarist  Jeff "Skunk" Baxter (Steely Dan, Doobie Brothers) which has Secretary of State Tony Blinken (guitar, vocals) as a regular guest.

He is the author of "Rocking Toward a Free World: When the Stratocaster beat the Kalashnikov" (Hatchette, 2019) about the influence of rock.

He appeared several times on The Colbert Report, a satirical political show on American cable television.

Early childhood
Simonyi was born 16 May 1952 in Budapest to a Catholic Mother and a Jewish father. As a four-year-old, he witnessed Soviet tanks roll past his home during the 1956 Hungarian Revolution. In 1961, Simony's father's profession as a textile engineer brought the family to Copenhagen, Denmark, where they would live for five years. In Denmark Simonyi attended British-run international-school and Danish government school, learning Danish and English. His family returned to Hungary 1967 in the atmosphere of hope of the thawing of the communist regime. This assumption proved wrong.

Simonyi majored in transport economics at the Karl Marx University of Economics in Budapest. He graduated in 1975, writing his thesis on Denmark's security policy in the 20th century.

Career
After university, Simonyi worked with many youth exchange programs, in particular the State Committee for Youth and the World Federation of Democratic Youth (WFDY), a "frontline" organization speaking out against the imperialist practices of capitalist countries and of NATO, but with a special interest in forging ties between youth organizations of the East and the West, a result of détente, to span from nato to Eastern Bloc countries. This work brought him into contact with the American Council of Young Political Leaders. From 1984 to 1989 he worked for the now defunct Hungarian Socialist Workers' Party in the foreign relations department with Gyula Horn and László Kovács, both architects of the changes in Eastern Europe in 1989.

In 2014, Simonyi, along with Nancy Brinker of the Susan G. Komen Foundation, former U.S. ambassador to Hungary and Ambassador David Huebner, the openly gay U.S. Ambassador to New Zealand, started "Ambassadors for Equality," an initiative to support LGBT rights around the world. Fifty current and former ambassadors have signed the pledge. In an interview, Simonyi said "[Affirming LGBT rights] should not be seen as an American endeavor because the U.S. cannot and should not do it alone because then it becomes an American thing and gets tangled in the anti-American sentiments we see in other countries. But if the U.S. and other countries hold hands for LGBT rights, then that makes a difference."

Appearances on The Colbert Report

On 9 August 2006, the character Stephen Colbert, (played by Stephen Colbert the actor) announced on his political talk show The Colbert Report (airing on the cable channel Comedy Central in the United States) that The Ministry of Transport of Hungary was soliciting suggestions for the name of a new bridge to be built over the Danube River north of Budapest, completing the M0 motorway-loop around the city.

On 14 September 2006 Ambassador Simonyi appeared on the American cable television channel Comedy Central's The Colbert Report to discuss a new bridge under construction in Hungary. The since-named Megyeri Bridge, completed in 2008, spans the River Danube just north of Budapest. Colbert (a U.S. citizen) had hoped the Hungarian government would name the innovative bridge after him, leading to the ambassador's appearance on the show.

Voting was taking place in an online poll on the Ministry's website. On 8 August 2006 the newswire service Reuters had reported that Chuck Norris was the leading candidate.

He appeared on the 10 April 2007 episode, in response to comments Colbert claimed to have made on his supposed radio show, Colbert on the Ert, about Hungarians' lack of guitar playing talent, in a parody of Don Imus' recent comments about the Rutgers women's basketball team. After referring to the alleged scandal throughout the episode, the ambassador appeared suddenly in the tag playing an electric guitar live. After Simonyi offered Colbert the Hungarian-made eagle-headed guitar, Colbert apologized, they both agreed that the Finnish could not play guitar, and Simonyi played as the show went to credits.

Literary work

" Rocking Toward a Free World: When the Stratocaster Beat the Kalashnikov " (Hatchette/Grand Central, 2019) a memoir about his childhood and youth, growing up behind the Iron Curtain with Western Rock and Roll music being his defining experience. The book, published in 2019, is a testament to the power of American and British Rock and Roll and how it became a tool to break the monopoly and the monotony of Marxist ideology "force fed" to the youths of Central and Eastern Europe by Soviet dominated authorities. Listening to Rock Music on Radio Free Europe, the Voice of America or Radio Luxemburg, the British pop radio-station, was his link to the West. "When I listened to that station, it was as if I had once again become one with my friends in the West. I closed my eyes and the border disappeared", he says in the book.

Music

As a seven year old  met American singer Paul Robeson in Budapest, which sealed his love of American blues music. In 1963 he heard the Beatles for the first time and has been a rock devotee ever since.

He is a lifelong practitioner of the electric guitar. He had his first rock band at age 15, the Purple Generator. In 2003 while ambassador to the United States, he became a founding member of The Coalition of the Willing with Jeff "Skunk" Baxter (Steely Dan, Doobie Brothers),  Linc Bloomfield (bass),  Dan Poneman (guitar), Alexander "Sandy" Vershbow (drums 2003–2004) and Dan McDermot (drums 2004–present). Secretary of State Antony Blinken (guitar, vocals), a personal and professional acquaintance of the band's members has played with the band since 2016.

He appeared with GoodTime Charlie lewis on famed guitarist Jerry Miller's (of Moby Grape)  2006 Best Friends CD.

You can sometimes find him  late at night jamming with musicians at Madam's Organ Blues Bar in Adams Morgan in Washington D.C.

Academia
In November 2010, Ambassador Simonyi began his tour of American university and college centers. He focused his lectures on building transatlantic relationships through innovation. At his visit with Ohio University Global Leadership Center undergraduates, Simonyi described a situation where the world has, as a positive thing, become affixed to ideas based in American innovation. He warned that the day "a Facebook or prominent innovation" comes "from Beijing rather than America" will be the day the West knows it has allowed itself to slow. Simonyi was honored by Ohio University students and faculty for his contributions to international diplomacy.

In February 2012, Johns Hopkins University announced that Simonyi joined the university as the managing director of the Center for Transatlantic Relations. He remained at Johns Hopkins University until May 2018. Today he is associated with the George Washington University.

Personal Life

He is married and has two children. His greatest influence are his parents. His political hero is Winston Churchill.

References

External links
Washington Diplomat Bio
Hungarian embassy in the USA: Simonyi presenting his letter of credence to President Bush
Columns at Huffington Post
Andras Simonyi Interview NAMM Oral History Library (2020)

1952 births
Living people
Ambassadors of Hungary to the United States
Diplomats from Budapest
Corvinus University of Budapest alumni